Udo is a masculine given name. It may refer to:

People

Medieval era
Udo of Neustria, 9th-century nobleman
Udo (Obotrite prince) (died 1028)
Udo (archbishop of Trier) (c. 1030 – 1078)
Lothair Udo II, Margrave of the Nordmark (c. 1025 – 1082)

Modern era
Udo Anneken (1917–1997), German Wehrmacht officer in World War II, recipient of the Knight's Cross of the Iron Cross
Udo Bullmann (born 1956), German politician
Udo Cordes (1921–2007), German Luftwaffe officer in World War II, recipient of the Knight's Cross of the Iron Cross
Udo Di Fabio (born 1954), German jurist
Udo Dziersk (born 1961), German painter
Udo Z. Karzi (born 1970), Indonesian writer
Udo Kasemets (1919–2014), Estonian-Canadian composer
Udo Keppler (1872–1956), American cartoonist
Udo Kier (born 1944), German actor
Udo Pastörs (born 1952), German far-right politician
Udo Proksch (1934–2001), Austrian businessman, industrialist and murderer
Udo Samel (born 1953), German actor
Udo Schaefer (1926–2019), German lawyer and Bahá'í author
Udo Schnelle (born 1952), German theologian and professor
Udo Sellbach (1927–2006), German-Australian visual artist and educator
Udo Spreitzenbarth, German photographer
Udo Steinke (1942–1999), German writer
Udo Uibo (born 1956), Estonian literary critic, editor, translator and lexicographer
Udo Voigt (born 1952), German politician and former soldier
Udo Walendy (1927–2022), German author, historian, former soldier and Holocaust denier
Udo Weilacher (born 1963), German landscape architect, author and professor
Udo von Woyrsch (1895–1983), high-ranking Nazi SS officer responsible for numerous murders during the Holocaust
Udo Zander (born 1959), Swedish organizational theorist and former professor of business administration

Music
Udo Dahmen (born 1951), German drummer and author
Udo Dirkschneider (born 1952), German heavy metal vocalist who formed the band U.D.O.
Udo Jürgens (1934–2014), Austrian composer and singer
Udo Lindenberg (born 1946), German rock musician and composer
Udo Mechels (born 1976), Belgian musician often known simply as "Udo"
Udo Suzuki (born 1970), Japanese musician and comedian
Udo Zimmermann (1943–2021), German composer, music director and conductor

Sports
Udo Beyer (born 1955), East German shot putter
Udo Bölts (born 1966), German retired racing cyclist
Udo Fortune (born 1988), Nigerian soccer player
Udo Gelhausen (born 1956), West German shot putter
Udo Hempel (born 1946), German retired road and track cyclist
Udo Horsmann (born 1952), German former footballer
Udo Kiessling (born 1955), first ice hockey player to compete in five Olympic Games (1976–1992)
Udo Lattek (1935–2015), German football player and coach and TV pundit
Udo Lehmann (born 1973), German former bobsledder
Udo Müller, East German slalom canoeist who competed in the 1970s
Udochukwu "Udo" Nwoko (born 1984), Maltese-Nigerian footballer
Udo Onwere (born 1971), English former footballer
Udo Poser (born 1947), East German swimmer
Udo Quellmalz (born 1967), German judoka
Udo Raumann (born 1969), German former slalom canoer
Udo Riglewski (born 1966), German retired tennis player
Udo Schütz (born 1937), German racing driver
Udo Schwarz (born 1986), German international rugby union player
Udo Segreff (born 1973), German ice sledge hockey player
Udo Wagner (born 1963), German fencer
Udo Werner (born 1955), West German slalom canoeist who competed from the late 1970s to the mid-1980s

Other
Udo of Aachen, fictional 13th-century monk created as a 1999 April Fool's hoax
Udo the Red Panda, mascot of the University of Mannheim athletics teams

German masculine given names
Estonian masculine given names